Named for Shining Rock, the Shining Rock Wilderness is a protected Wilderness Area in Haywood County, North Carolina. Its first  have been part of the National Wilderness Preservation System since the System was created in 1964. It now includes , and is managed by the United States Forest Service as part of the Pisgah National Forest. It is separated from Middle Prong Wilderness to the southwest, by NC 215.

Within the wilderness, the Art Loeb Trail can be followed to the base of Cold Mountain, where a spur trail leads to the summit. Cold Mountain is the namesake of a historical fiction novel by Charles Frazier, and its film adaptation; both are set in the time of the American Civil War.

Due to conflicts with black bears, in 2015 the Forest Service implemented a requirement for all overnight campers to carry bear-resistant canisters.  Canisters are required year-round in the Wilderness Area and south of it to the Blue Ridge Parkway.

References
Notes

Sources
Shining Rock Wilderness at recreation.gov
Shining Rock Wilderness at wilderness.net

External links
 Webcam View of Cold Mountain, Shining Rock Wilderness
 Effects of Future Sulfate and Nitrate Deposition Scenarios on Linville Gorge and Shining Rock Wildernesses United States Department of Agriculture

Wilderness areas of the Appalachians
Protected areas of Haywood County, North Carolina
IUCN Category Ib
Wilderness areas of North Carolina
Pisgah National Forest